Beatriz Ros (born 12 May 1974) is a Spanish long-distance runner. She competed in the women's marathon at the 2004 Summer Olympics held in Athens, Greece. She finished in 32nd place.

In 2003, she competed in the women's marathon at the 2003 World Championships in Athletics held in Paris, France. She finished in 13th place.

References

External links
 

1974 births
Living people
Athletes (track and field) at the 2004 Summer Olympics
Spanish female long-distance runners
Spanish female marathon runners
Olympic athletes of Spain
Athletes from Madrid
World Athletics Championships athletes for Spain